Gerhard Weber (11 June 190917 March 1986) was a German architect and lecturer. Weber was a student of Mies van der Rohe and is associated with the Bauhaus school.

Weber was born in Mylau. Between 1955 and 1974 he was a professor for architecture at the Technical University of Munich. Considered one of the leading post-war architects in Germany, his architectural estate is today being maintained by the Bauhaus Archive.

At the 1957 São Paulo Art Biennial Weber was awarded the prize as best theatre architect.

He died in Berg.

Notable works 
 Broadcasting House Dornbusch
 Hamburg State Opera
 Mannheim National Theatre
  (Broadcasting House of the Deutschlandfunk)
Market Hall, Frankfurt
August Thyssen-Hütte headquarters, Duisburg
 (Research Reactor of the Technical University Munich, in Garching)
his private residence "Weber Villa", Allmannshausen (a district of Berg)

References

External links 
 
 Gerhard Weber at architekten-portrait

20th-century German architects
Bauhaus alumni
1909 births
1986 deaths